Vere Parish was one of the historic parishes of Jamaica created after the colonization of the island by the British Empire. It was in the south of the island in Middlesex County but was abolished in 1866 when it was merged into Clarendon Parish.

References

External links 
Our Parishes. gleaner.com

Parishes of Jamaica
1866 disestablishments